Aïn El Ibel is a town and commune in Djelfa Province, Algeria. According to the 1998 census it has a population of 20,436. The N18 and the N1 Trans Saharan highway connects it to the provincial capital of Djelfa in the northeast. To the southwest of the town are a number of fields in which the inhabitants grow crops.

References

Communes of Djelfa Province
Djelfa Province